Ebore Canella (born 23 March 1913, date of death unknown) was an Italian gymnast. She competed in the women's artistic team all-around event at the 1936 Summer Olympics.

References

1913 births
Year of death missing
Italian female artistic gymnasts
Olympic gymnasts of Italy
Gymnasts at the 1936 Summer Olympics
Sportspeople from Genoa